The Manley School, at 115 Cherry St. in Manley, Nebraska, was built in 1931.  It was listed on the National Register of Historic Places in 2004.

It was deemed to be "a fine example of the Craftsman style of architecture applied to a public building."  When listed in 2004, the school had served for more than 70 years and was still in use.

The 1931 school replaced one built in 1889.  Enrollment in the school District 96 was 45 students in 1888, 75 in 1904.  It housed grades K-10 until 1950.  From 1982 on it was just K-6.

References

External links

Schools in Nebraska
National Register of Historic Places in Cass County, Nebraska
School buildings completed in 1931
School buildings on the National Register of Historic Places in Nebraska